Weengallon is a rural locality in the Goondiwindi Region, Queensland, Australia. In the  Weengallon had a population of 30 people.

The Barwon Highway goes through the locale.

History 

The significant cultural area of the Ngaru-gi Gali ('to drink') or Weengallon rock wells are four large water holes, some twelve metres deep, and several smaller ones.  These wells were used by the Indigenous Australians, including the Kalkadoon as they moved from Mount Isa south for ceremonies and business towards Goondiwindi, and further coastal towards the Bunya Mountains.  Another rock well exists at Thornby on the Moonie Highway near Saint George.  

The Weengallon property was in existence by 1867, although in July that year, the  run was forfeited for sale. While for cattle, it was noted in 1906 that there was not always water, and a distance from a railway station or siding.

A Weengallon Progress Association was in existence by 1913.  

By the 1930s, the locale had a public hall, and hosted a ball by Queensland Country Women's Association, cricket, and later, an annual Catholic Ball.  

The locality was officially named and bounded on 26 November 1999.

In the  Weengallon had a population of 30 people.

Gallery

References 

Goondiwindi Region
Localities in Queensland
 Australian Aboriginal cultural history